Mayna is an urban locality (urban-type settlement) under the administrative jurisdiction of the town of republican significance of Sayanogorsk of the Republic of Khakassia, Russia. Population:

References

Notes

Sources

Urban-type settlements in Khakassia